6-phosphofructo-2-kinase/fructose-2,6-biphosphatase 1 is an enzyme that in humans is encoded by the PFKFB1 gene.

This gene encodes a member of the family of bifunctional 6-phosphofructo-2-kinase:fructose-2,6-biphosphatase enzymes. The enzyme forms a homodimer that catalyzes both the synthesis and degradation of fructose-2,6-biphosphate using independent catalytic domains. Fructose-2,6-biphosphate is an activator of the glycolysis pathway and an inhibitor of the gluconeogenesis pathway. Consequently, regulating fructose-2,6-biphosphate levels through the activity of this enzyme is thought to regulate glucose homeostasis.

References

Further reading